Susannaberg is a neighborhood on the island of Saint John in the United States Virgin Islands. Part of this area is inside Virgin Islands National Park. The island's medical clinic, lumberyard, and several other businesses are located in Susannaberg.

History

Susannaberg was during the Danish colonial era the name of a sugar plantation.

References

Populated places in Saint John, U.S. Virgin Islands
Plantations in the Danish West Indies